St. Joseph's College (SJC) is a national school in Trincomalee, Eastern Province, Sri Lanka.

History 
The school was founded on 27 July 1867 by Rev. Fr. Louis Mary Keating. On 1 April 1931 the Roman Catholic Diocese of Trincomalee-Batticaloa handed the school over to the Society of Jesus of the Province of Louisiana. Most private schools in Ceylon were taken over by the government in 1960 but SJC chose to remain as a private and non-fee levying school. The school struggled financially thereafter and ten years later the school was handed over to the government.

Principals

 1867–1881 Rev.Fr.L.Mary Keating O.M.I
 1882–1901 Rev.Fr.Charles Manict O.M.I
 1902–1911 Rev.Fr.Charles Bonnel S.J 
 1912–1920 Rev.Fr.Charles Reichard S.J
 1921–1932 Rev.Fr.S.M.Soosaimuttu S.J
 1932–1938 Rev.Fr.A.E.A.Crowther S.J
 1938–1947 Rev.Fr.Julius Theisen S.J
 1947–1953 Rev.Fr.Claude R.Dalys S.J
 1954–1955 Rev.Fr.Peter.C.Beach S.J
 1955–1956 Rev.Fr.John J.Heaney S.J
 1956–1965 Rev.Fr.Frederick.B.Ponder S.J
 1969–1970 Rev.Fr.Eugene J.Herbert S.J
 1965–1968,1970–1981 Rev.Fr.Vincent De Paul Gnanapragasam S.J
 1981–1985 Mr.Anthony Saminathan
 1985–1989 Mr.D.S.A.Wanasinghe
 1989–1997 Mr.J.S.Guy De Font Gallan J.P
 1997–2002 Rev.Bro.Anthonypillai Soosaithasan SSJ
 2003–2012 Rev.Fr.Jeevanadas Fernando O.M.I
 2012–2016 Rev.Fr.S.Anthony Poncian O.M.I
 2016–present. Rev.Fr.Alfred Vijayakamalan

Notable alumni 

 Joseph Ponniah, Priest
 R. Sampanthan, Politician and Lawyer
 Noel Emmanuel, Priest

See also 
 List of schools in Eastern Province, Sri Lanka
 List of Jesuit sites

References 

National schools in Sri Lanka
Schools in Trincomalee
Educational institutions established in 1867
1867 establishments in Ceylon